Ahang (also Romanized as Āhang; also known as Ohak) is a village in Jazin Rural District, in the Central District of Bajestan County, Razavi Khorasan Province, Iran. At the 2006 census, its population was 427, in 141 families.

See also 

 List of cities, towns and villages in Razavi Khorasan Province

References 

Populated places in Bajestan County